Illumination (formerly known as Illumination Entertainment) is an American computer animation studio, founded by Chris Meledandri in 2007. Illumination is owned by Meledandri and the Illumination brand is co-owned by Universal Pictures, a division of Comcast through its wholly owned subsidiary NBCUniversal. Meledandri produces the films, while Universal finances and distributes them. The studio is the creator of the Despicable Me, The Secret Life of Pets and Sing franchises and the film adaptations of Dr. Seuss' books The Lorax and How the Grinch Stole Christmas. The Minions, characters from the Despicable Me series, are the mascots of the studio.

Illumination has produced 12 feature films, with an average gross of $695.4 million per film. The studio's highest-grossing films are Minions ($1.159 billion) and Despicable Me 3 ($1.034 billion). Both films are among the 50 highest-grossing films of all time, and six of their films are among the 50 highest-grossing animated films.

History

Meledandri left as President of 20th Century Fox Animation and Blue Sky Studios in early 2007. While at those companies he supervised or executive-produced movies including Ice Age, Ice Age: The Meltdown, Robots, and Dr. Seuss' Horton Hears a Who! After leaving, he founded Illumination Entertainment and a deal was announced positioning Illumination Entertainment as NBC Universal's family entertainment arm, that would produce one to two films a year starting in 2010. As part of the deal, Illumination retains creative control and Universal Pictures exclusively distributes the films.

In 2011, Illumination acquired the animation department of the French animation and visual effects studio Mac Guff, which animated Despicable Me and Dr. Seuss' The Lorax, and formed Illumination Mac Guff (later Illumination Studios Paris).

On August 22, 2016, NBCUniversal acquired competing studio DreamWorks Animation, which fuelled speculation that Meledandri was to oversee both studios. While he had been approached by NBCUniversal to oversee both studios, he turned down the offer and later explained “I love the process of making films and working with artists. I don’t think I’m particularly great at managing companies”.

On September 23, 2022, Illumination announced its hiring of former Netflix head of adult animation Mike Moon as senior creative advisor, and a new label led by Moon known as Moonlight, which will aim to "produce animated films that push beyond the family genre".

Process
In a similar fashion to Sony Pictures Animation and DreamWorks Animation, Illumination does not produce its films in-house where it is based in Santa Monica, but rather outsources the animation production of its films to other studios. Most of its films are animated by Illumination Studios Paris, a subsidiary formed through the purchase of Mac Guff (which animated the first Despicable Me). So far, the only Illumination film not to be animated by Illumination Studios Paris or Mac Guff was Hop, which was animated by Rhythm & Hues Studios.

Not unlike Pixar, in its early days Illumination depended on a core group of directors and writers to create its films. The directors of Despicable Me, Pierre Coffin and Chris Renaud, also directed or co-directed Dr. Seuss' The Lorax, Despicable Me 2, Minions, The Secret Life of Pets, and Despicable Me 3. Screenwriters Cinco Paul and Ken Daurio (who had written Dr. Seuss' Horton Hears a Who! for Meledandri at Fox) wrote or co-wrote Despicable Me, Hop, Dr. Seuss' The Lorax, Despicable Me 2, The Secret Life of Pets, and Despicable Me 3, while screenwriter Brian Lynch wrote or co-wrote Hop, Minions, and The Secret Life of Pets.

Illumination's films have a budget between $60–80 million. Meledandri prefers to keep Illumination adhering to a low-cost model, recognising that "strict cost controls and hit animated films are not mutually exclusive". In an industry where film expenses often exceed $100 million, Illumination's first two releases were completed with significantly lower budgets, considering Despicable Me $69 million budget and Hop $63 million budget. One way the company sustains a lean financial model is by employing cost-conscious animation techniques that lower the expenses and render times of its computer graphics. To date, Sing 2 is the studio's most expensive film, with an $85 million budget.

Projects

The studio's first film, Despicable Me, directed by Chris Renaud and Pierre Coffin, was released on July 9, 2010, and was commercially successful, earning $56 million on its opening weekend, and going on to ticket sales of $251 million domestically and $543 million worldwide. Illumination's second film was the live-action/CGI hybrid Hop. Directed by Tim Hill and released on April 1, 2011, the film had a $37 million opening, ending up with $108 million domestically and $183 million worldwide. Hop was followed by an adaptation of Dr. Seuss' The Lorax (also directed by Renaud), which debuted on March 2, 2012, earning $70 million on its opening weekend, and with eventual totals of $214 million in the US market and $348 million worldwide. The studio's first sequel, Despicable Me 2, again directed by Renaud and Coffin, opened in the United States on July 3, 2013, to a domestic five-day opening weekend of $142 million (and $82 million over the regular three-day frame), making it, at the time of its release, the biggest animated film to open on that frame. The film would go on to earn $368 million domestically and $970 million worldwide, becoming the second highest-grossing 2013 animated film and breaking a record as the most profitable Universal Studios film in its 100-year history. A spin-off of the Despicable Me franchise, titled Minions, directed by Coffin and newcomer Kyle Balda, was released on July 10, 2015 to a domestic opening weekend of $115 million. The film would go on to gross $336 million domestically and $823 million overseas, amounting to a worldwide total of $1.159 billion, making it the highest-grossing animated film of 2015 and, at the time of its release, the second highest-grossing animated film of all time, behind Walt Disney Animation Studios' Frozen (2013).

The Secret Life of Pets was released on July 8, 2016. Directed by Renaud and Yarrow Cheney, the film would earn $104 million in its opening weekend, going on to gross $368 million domestically, and $875 million worldwide. Sing, a comedy written and directed by Garth Jennings, was released on December 21, 2016. It was the first movie for the studio to have a Christmas release. The film would earn $56 million in its first 5 days, grossing $270 million stateside and $634 million worldwide. It also holds the record for the highest-grossing film not to ever be at No. 1 in its run. Despicable Me 3, which reunited Coffin and Balda as directors, was released on June 30, 2017, to a $75 million domestic opening weekend. The film would then go on to gross $264 million domestically and $1.034 billion worldwide, making it the second film from the studio to cross the $1 billion mark, as well as highest-grossing animated film of 2017. At the time of its release, it also set a record for the highest theatre count ever with 4,536 theatres in its second week. The film that followed was an adaptation of Dr. Seuss' How the Grinch Stole Christmas!, simply titled The Grinch, which was released on November 9, 2018, with Scott Mosier and Cheney as directors and featuring a screenplay by Michael LeSieur and Tommy Swerdlow. The film opened to $67 million in its first domestic weekend and went on to earn $271 million stateside and $513 million worldwide, making it the highest-grossing Christmas film of all time. The Secret Life of Pets 2, again directed by Renaud, was released on June 7, 2019, to a domestic opening weekend of $47 million, going on to gross $159 million stateside and $446 million worldwide, making less than half of its predecessor.

It was followed by Sing 2, again directed by Jennings, which was released on December 22, 2021. Despite opening to a modest $41 million over a five-day weekend (and $23 million over the normal three-day frame), the film would eventually become the highest-grossing animated film of 2021, as well as the highest-grossing animated film released during the COVID-19 pandemic, earning $163 million stateside and $408 million worldwide. Minions: The Rise of Gru, directed by Balda, was released on July 1, 2022, after a delay of two years caused by the COVID-19 pandemic. The film earned $125 million stateside over the four-day July 4 weekend, a new record over said timeframe. The film would go on to overtake Sing 2 as the highest-grossing animated film during the pandemic, with $369 million domestically and $939 million worldwide.

On May 19, 2011, Illumination announced that it would be working with Universal Studios to create Despicable Me Minion Mayhem, a 3-D ride at Universal Parks & Resorts in Orlando, Hollywood, and Osaka. The ride officially opened on July 2, 2012, in Orlando, in Hollywood on April 12, 2014, and in Osaka on April 21, 2017. In April 2019, it was announced they would collaborate again on the creation of The Secret Life of Pets: Off the Leash!, a dark ride attraction at Universal Studios Hollywood. While its opening was scheduled for March 27, 2020, it was delayed until further notice due to the novel coronavirus outbreak. It eventually opened on April 8, 2021.

Future projects include The Super Mario Bros. Movie, an animated film based on the Mario franchise as a collaboration with Nintendo on April 5, 2023, an original film titled Migration on December 22, 2023, and Despicable Me 4 on July 3, 2024. Other films the studio has in development include Big Tree, a film based on an illustrated novel by Brian Selznick from an idea by Meledandri and Steven Spielberg, The Secret Life of Pets 3, and an original animated film with frequent collaborator and musician Pharrell Williams that will be "made from scratch."

Franchises

See also

Illumination Studios Paris
DreamWorks Animation
List of DreamWorks Animation productions
Universal Animation Studios
List of Universal Pictures theatrical animated feature films
List of unproduced Universal Pictures animated projects
List of animated feature films of the 2010s
List of highest-grossing animated films of the 2010s

References

External links

Illumination Mac Guff official website

2007 establishments in California
American animation studios
Companies based in Santa Monica, California
American companies established in 2007
Mass media companies established in 2007
 
Universal Pictures subsidiaries
Film production companies of the United States